M'Chedellah District is a district of Bouïra Province, Algeria.

Municipalities
The district is further divided into 6 municipalities:
M'Chedallah
Chorfa 
Ath Mansour Taourirt
Saharidj
Ahnif
Aghbalou

Districts of Bouïra Province